Taltson River Airport  is located at Taltson River in the Northwest Territories, Canada. Prior permission is required to land except in the case of an emergency.

References

Registered aerodromes in the South Slave Region